Girolamo Petroni (died 1591) was a Roman Catholic prelate who served as Bishop of Terni (1581–1591).

Biography
On 16 January 1581, Girolamo Petroni was appointed by Pope Gregory XIII as Bishop of Terni.
He served as Bishop of Terni until his death in 1591.

References

External links and additional sources
 (for Chronology of Bishops) 
 (for Chronology of Bishops) 

16th-century Italian Roman Catholic bishops
1591 deaths
Bishops appointed by Pope Gregory XIII